Fortaleza de Santa Cruz da Barra is a fort located in Niterói, Rio de Janeiro in Brazil.

See also
Military history of Brazil

References

External links

Santa Cruz da Barra
Buildings and structures in Rio de Janeiro (state)
Portuguese colonial architecture in Brazil